Target for Tonight (or Target for To-Night) is a 1941 British World War II documentary film billed as filmed and acted by the Royal Air Force, all during wartime operations. It was directed by Harry Watt for the Crown Film Unit. The film is about the crew of a Wellington bomber taking part in a bombing mission over Nazi Germany. The film won an honorary Academy Award in 1942 as Best Documentary by the National Board of Review.
Despite purporting to be a documentary there are multiple indicators that it is not quite as such: film shots include studio shots taken from the exterior of the aircraft looking into the cockpit whilst "in flight"; several stilted sections of dialogue are clearly scripted; on the ground  shots of bombing are done using model trains; and several actors appear (including Gordon Jackson as the young rear gunner). The film does give a unique insight into the confined nature of the Wellington's interior and some of the nuances of day to day operation such as ground crew holding a blanket over the engine while it starts to regulate oxygen intake.

Plot
After text cards explaining RAF Bomber Command chain of command, the film begins with an Avro Anson flying over an RAF base and dropping a box of undeveloped film. After developing and analysis, it reveals that a major oil storage facility has been built at Freihausen in the Freiburg region. A squadron of Vickers Wellingtons are allocated to attack it that night. The planning of a mission to reach and hit the target is depicted, detailing how munitions for the task are selected. One bomb on each aircraft is a delayed-action bomb.

The weather forecast is expected to be good, and the aircrews are briefed. Among the pilots is P. C. Pickard, a real life RAF officer and holder of the DSO. In the film Pickard played Squadron Leader Dixon, the pilot of Wellington "F-OJ", call sign "F for Freddie".

Once the briefing is completed the crew suit up before being driven to their bomber located on the airfield dispersal. The station groundcrew assist with the starting of the aircraft's engines, before it taxies to the end of the airfield and with clearance obtained from the runway controller, the crew take off into the dusk. The time is 19:51hrs.

Over Germany the target is reached at 23:45hrs with bombs released at 23:53hrs, the first four falling short of the target but the final one scoring a direct hit. As the aircraft clears the target area it is hit by flak, the radio operator suffers a wound to his leg, his set is put out of action and a hit to the port engine means that the aircraft can barely hold altitude. Dixon's crew in "F for Freddie" are the last aircraft to return, by which time fog covers the airfield. Tension builds as he locates the base and brings the damaged Wellington down safely, landing back at "Millerton" at 04:15hrs. No aircraft are lost from the mission and the target was set ablaze, so it is considered a complete success.

Production
The film was shot by the Royal Air Force Film Unit, with location filming being carried out during the last two weeks of March and the first two weeks of April 1941 at RAF Mildenhall. Aircraft used in the filming consisted of resident Vickers Wellington bombers and the crews of No. 149 Squadron which carried the squadron code "OJ". The exception to this was Pickard, who was at that time Squadron Leader with No. 311 (Czechoslovak) Squadron.

Filming also took place at RAF Bomber Command headquarters in High Wycombe, with the head of Bomber Command Sir Richard Peirse and Senior Air Staff Officer Sir Robert Saundby appearing in the film. In order to avoid giving information to the enemy, RAF Mildenhall took the fictitious name of "Millerton Aerodrome", and several other aspects of day-to-day operations of the command were altered. Squadron Leader Dickson, who skippered "F for Freddie," was played by Percy Charles Pickard, who went on to lead Operation Biting and Operation Jericho, a raid to release prisoners from the Amiens Prison. During this mission Pickard lost his life, as did his navigator, Flight Lieutenant J. A. "Bill" Broadley. The second pilot in the film was played by Gordon Woollatt. Also appearing (and uncredited) is Constance Babington Smith, who was a serving WAAF officer at the time and was responsible for photographic interpretation of aerial reconnaissance pictures. Appearing in the control room scene is motor racing driver John Cobb, then a serving RAF officer.

Film brochure

A 30-page brochure entitled The Book of the famous film Target for To-Night and sub-titled The Record in Text and Pictures of a Bombing Raid on Germany was released in 1941. It covered various scenes from the film along with photographic stills and was sold for 6d (six old pence). It was adapted from Harry Watt's screenplay by Paul Holt of the Daily Express.

Reception
According to Warner Bros the film earned that studio $229,000 domestically and $18,000 foreign.

Popular culture
At the end of the war Harry Watt, the film's director, noted with regret that most of the flight officers and crew who appeared in the film did not survive the duration of the war. For example, the front gunner in the film was played by Flight-sergeant Joseph Ronald Bird who lost his life on the 27/28 August 1942 flying as rear gunner of a Short Stirling aircraft whilst on a bombing mission to Kassel, Germany.

The January 1987 episode of 'Allo 'Allo!, "Pretty Maids All In A Row", contains a scene where the rescue of two British airmen by plane is hampered by the fact that all spare British aircraft are currently being used for a movie named F For Freddie.

Scenes from the film were included in the British World War II documentary The World at War, in the episode "Whirlwind".

Herman Wouk, in his novel The Winds of War, included a Wellington bomber christened "F for Freddie" in an episode of the story. The lead character, American naval captain Victor Henry, flies onboard "F for Freddie" as an observer during a bombing mission over Berlin. Wouk's fictional narrative evokes portions of the real "F for Freddie"'s mission log: one of their bombs hits their target squarely and flak damages the plane and injures one of their crew members in the leg (in the novel, the rear gunner rather than the radio operator). They have trouble holding altitude but make it back after a long, tense flight over hostile territory.

Commando Comics issue #977 “O-For-Orange” possibly involves a reference to Target For Tonight with the crew of the titular aircraft and the aircraft itself, a Wellington, becoming famous after starring in a propaganda film.

A possible identity of "F for Freddie" is Wellington Mk 1c OJ-F ("P2517") which was serving with No. 149 Squadron from November 1940 to September 1941.

References

Bibliography

External links
 
 
 
 
 

1941 films
1941 documentary films
British aviation films
British documentary films
British World War II propaganda films
World War II aviation films
Warner Bros. films
Crown Film Unit films
Documentary films about military aviation
Films directed by Harry Watt
British black-and-white films